The accumulation/distribution line or accumulation/distribution index in the stock market, is a technical analysis indicator intended to relate price and volume, which supposedly acts as a leading indicator of price movements.

Formula
 

This ranges from -1 when the close is the low of the day, to +1 when it's the high.  For instance if the close is 3/4 the way up the range then CLV is +0.5.  The accumulation/distribution index adds up volume multiplied by the CLV factor, i.e.

 

The starting point for the acc/dist total, i.e. the zero point, is arbitrary, only the shape of the resulting indicator is used, not the actual level of the total.

The name accumulation/distribution comes from the idea that during accumulation buyers are in control and the price will be bid up through the day, or will make a recovery if sold down, in either case more often finishing near the day's high than the low. The opposite applies during distribution.

The accumulation/distribution index is similar to on balance volume, but acc/dist is based on the close within the day's range, instead of the close-to-close up or down that the latter uses.

Chaikin oscillator
A Chaikin oscillator is formed by subtracting a 10-day exponential moving average from a 3-day exponential moving average of the accumulation/distribution index. Being an indicator of an indicator, it can give various sell or buy signals, depending on the context and other indicators.

Similar indicators 
Other Price × Volume indicators:
 Money Flow
 On-balance Volume
 Price and Volume Trend

See also 
 Dimensional analysis - explains why volume and price are multiplied (not divided) in such indicators
 Glossary of stock market terms
 Modeling and analysis of financial markets

References

Technical indicators